Palasa railway station (station code: PSA) is located in the Indian state of Andhra Pradesh, serves Palasa and surrounding areas in Srikakulam district.

History 

Reorganization 
The Bengal Nagpur Railway was nationalized in 1944. Eastern Railway was formed on 14 April 1952 with the portion of East Indian Railway Company east of Mughalsarai and the Bengal Nagpur Railway. In 1955, South Eastern Railway was carved out of Eastern Railway. It comprised lines mostly operated by BNR earlier. Amongst the new zones started in April 2003 were East Coast Railway and South East Central Railway. Both these railways were carved out of South Eastern Railway.

Electrification
The Palasa–Tilaru sector was electrified in 1998–99.

Amenities
Palasa railway station has a double-bedded non-AC retiring room. Other amenities at the railway station include computerized reservation offices, telephone booth, cloak room, waiting room, vegetarian and non-vegetarian refreshment rooms and book stall.

Classification 

Palasa railway station is classified as an A–category station in the Khurda road railway division.

Performance 
Palasa railway station serves about 75,000 passengers every day.

Railway reorganization
The Bengal Nagpur Railway was nationalized in 1944. Eastern Railway was formed on 14 April 1952 with the portion of East Indian Railway Company east of Mughalsarai and the Bengal Nagpur Railway. In 1955, South Eastern Railway was carved out of Eastern Railway. It comprised lines mostly operated by BNR earlier. Amongst the new zones started in April 2003 were East Coast Railway and South East Central Railway. Both these railways were carved out of South Eastern Railway.

References

External links

 Trains at Palasa

Railway stations in Srikakulam district
Khurda Road railway division
Railway stations in India opened in 1893